Ithu Namma Veedu (This is our house) is a 2017 Singaporean Tamil-language comedy-drama starring Narain, Udhaya, Jayaram, Kokila, Leena, Lingam and Iliyash. It replaced Iruvar and it broadcast on MediaCorp Vasantham  from 3 April 2017 to 29 June 2017 for 47 episodes.

Plot
It is a Comedy Drama about three family, A comedy riot ensued when Ajith (Narain), a successful self-made tycoon, opens an old age home in which the seniors live in comfort and luxury. Gayu (Udhaya) is a bubbly girl who tries her best to impress the guy of her dreams. Avinash (Jayaram), Ajith Cousin who is wildly jealous of Ajith good life and Avinash love Gayathiri but Gayathiri Love Ajith.

Cast
Main cast

 Narain as Ajith Pillai
 Udhaya as Gayathiri (Gayu)
 Jayaram as Avinash (Ajith Cousin)
 Kokila
 Leena
Durai Shiva as Lingam son
 Lingam
 Iliyash
 Jayanthi
 Yuvina as Devi
 Alikhan as Don Muthappa
 Kunaselan
 Parashakthi Azhagu
 T. Nagulan
 Nagaraj

Supporting Cast

 Kalaiyarasi
 Kayitha
 Rajith
 Gayathiri
 Viknesh
 Kasthuri
 Supra
 Thashmassri

Original soundtrack

Title song
It was written by lyricist Parthiban Seetharaman, sung by Rita K.G Ranjith.

Soundtrack

Background score
Composed by Vicknesh Saravanan.

Broadcast
Series was released on 3 April 2017 on Mediacorp Vasantham. It aired in Singapore and Malaysia on Mediacorp Vasantham, Its full length episodes and released its episodes on their app Toggle.

References

External links 
 Vasantham Official Website Toggle

Tamil-language comedy television series
Singapore Tamil dramas
2017 Tamil-language television series debuts
Vasantham TV original programming
Tamil-language television shows in Singapore]
2017 Tamil-language television series endings